Ma Ying is the name of:

Ma Ying (gymnast) (born 1971), Chinese gymnast
Ma Ying (softball) (born 1972), Chinese softball player

See also
Maying (disambiguation) for places
Ma Yin (853–930), late-Tang dynasty warlord and founding king of Ma Chu